The Sheepdogs are a Canadian rock band formed in Saskatoon, Saskatchewan in 2004.  The Sheepdogs were the first unsigned band to make the cover of Rolling Stone and have gone on to a career featuring multi-platinum album sales and four Juno Awards.

Frontman Ewan Currie, the band's primary songwriter, has described the band's guitar-driven blues-rock style as "pure, simple, good-time music"; he's said that the band aims to land in the sweet spot in between Led Zeppelin and Crosby, Stills & Nash. Currie has further credited Creedence Clearwater Revival, Stevie Wonder, The Beatles, and The Allman Brothers Band as influences on the band's style.

One critic has praised the band's "infectiously catchy, soulful, retro sound with beautiful harmonies and a pinch of southern rock."

The Sheepdogs are on the road frequently between recordings. They have headlined tours across Canada and the United States, the United Kingdom, Eastern and Western Europe, and Australia, and have performed at a number of large festivals including South by Southwest, Coachella, Glastonbury, Bonnaroo, and Lollapalooza.

History

Early history and formation: The Breaks EP, Trying to Grow, The Big Stand, Learn & Burn (2004 – 2010)
The band formed in Saskatoon, Saskatchewan in the summer of 2004, while Ewan Currie, Ryan Gullen, and Sam Corbett were all studying at the University of Saskatchewan. Corbett had an old bass guitar and a gift certificate to a local music store, so they rented a drum kit and started playing in Corbett's parents' basement with Corbett on drums, Gullen playing the bass, and Currie playing a recently purchased electric guitar. The band began with a repertoire of 1970s blues-rock songs as well as newer material, including covers of the early Black Keys and Kings of Leon, while also writing their own music. Currie, Gullen, and Corbett called their trio The Breaks and released an EP in 2006.

In the summer of 2006, Currie, Gullen, and Corbett met Leot Hanson, who was playing acoustic guitar at a party. Hanson was playing a Kings of Leon song from Youth & Young Manhood, and the trio joined in. The next day, Hanson joined the band and they changed their name to The Sheepdogs.

In 2006, The Sheepdogs independently released their first album Trying to Grow, which they recorded at Cosmic Pad Studios in Saskatoon. Two years later, after almost constant touring, The Sheepdogs returned to Cosmic Pad Studios to record their second album, Big Stand. The first two records were small affairs, including artwork by friends and family, and were mixed by the band.

The band released its third studio album, Learn & Burn, in 2010. The band recorded the album on their own, with their own equipment, a circumstance which they appreciated for giving them freedom to explore new sounds and techniques, including a nod to the psychedelic rock of the 1960s.

Rolling Stone cover contest: Learn & Burn Deluxe, Five Easy Pieces EP  (2011)
In early 2011, a music manager that the band had met in Toronto, Ontario submitted a demo tape to Atlantic Records, which resulted in them being one of 16 bands chosen to be part of the Rolling Stone "Choose the Cover" competition" With the new international spotlight on the band and while the band was waiting to find out the results of the contest, Learn & Burn was given a re-release, in May. That summer, the Sheepdogs beat fifteen other bands to win the contest, and were featured on the August 18, 2011, cover of Rolling Stone—the first unsigned act to do so. During the competition, the band made appearances on Late Night with Jimmy Fallon and performed at the Bonnaroo Music Festival as well as The Osheaga Festival in Montreal, Quebec.

The Rolling Stone cover arrived on the heels of the band's Five Easy Pieces EP, which debuted at No. 7 on the Canadian Albums Chart, selling 3,300 copies. Following the contest win, the band signed with Atlantic Records.

In April 2012, the re-released Learn & Burn garnered three Juno Awards—for Rock Album of the Year, Best New Group, and Single of the Year. The band was touring in Australia with John Fogerty at the time and were unable to attend the ceremony.

International touring and personnel changes: (The Sheepdogs) (2012 – 2014)
In early 2012 the Sheepdogs began work on a new album which was produced by The Black Keys drummer Patrick Carney, recorded during an intensive two-week session at Haptown Studios in Nashville, Tennessee. Released on September 4, 2012, the band's self-titled major-label debut garnered them their second platinum sales certification. The album generated international interest, and led to a long stretch of touring, both in Canada and overseas, from 2012 into 2013 including performances at Coachella Music Festival, Lollapalooza, Bonaroo, Edgefest, Glastonbury, and Ottawa Bluesfest.

This tour saw Shamus Currie, younger brother of lead singer Ewan Currie, become a touring member of the Sheepdogs, after having previously played trombone on The Big Stand and Learn & Burn.

The Sheepdogs earned three Juno nominations for Single of the Year, Rock Album of the Year and Group of the Year, in addition to performing "Feeling Good" live on the broadcast at the 2013 Juno Awards in Regina, Saskatchewan.

On November 24, 2013, The Sheepdogs performed at the CFL's 101st Grey Cup live on television.  The game saw their home province Saskatchewan Roughriders beat the Hamilton Tiger Cats.

In March 2014, director Matt Barnes and the Sheepdogs won the Juno Award for Video of the Year for "Feeling Good." That same year the band played tribute to and inducted Bachman Turner Overdrive into the Canadian Music Hall of Fame, performing "Let it Ride" and "Takin’ Care of Business" with BTO live on the Juno Award broadcast. In July 2014, Leot Hanson left the band. Following his departure, Winnipeg guitarist Rusty Matyas, a friend of the band, stepped in as guitarist for the tour promoting The Sheepdogs. This led to Matyas joining the band as a full-time touring and recording member until the fall of 2015.

Addition of Jimmy Bowskill: Future Nostalgia (2015 – 2016)
On July 3, 2015, the band released "Downtown," the first single from what would be their fifth studio album Future Nostalgia. The album itself was released on October 2, 2015, via Warner Music Canada and Dine Alone Records. The 18-track record was well received by reviewers and fans, nearing the top of the iTunes Canadian charts. Future Nostalgia was recorded in a rented cottage in Stony Lake, Ontario, engineered by Matt Ross-Spang, and produced by lead singer and songwriter Ewan Currie. Currie explained the choice, saying: "We wanted to cut out all the noise and get back to a place where we could just fully immerse ourselves in music." The band worked on the album full-time in Stony Lake, seeking some middle ground between the informal garage sound of the Learn & Burn and the whirlwind sessions in Nashville with Carney which produced The Sheepdogs.

In November 2015, award-winning blues guitarist Jimmy Bowskill from Bailieboro, Ontario, joined the band in advance of the European leg of their Future Nostalgia Tour, playing guitar and pedal steel.

Future Nostalgia garnered the Sheepdogs another Juno nomination for Rock Album of the year in 2016.

When they were finished recording Future Nostalgia, brothers Ewan and Shamus Currie started working on a side project they called BROS. Their debut LP, titled Vol.1, was released on October 14, 2016, via Dine Alone Records.

International expansion: Changing Colours  (2017 – 2019)
When it came time to record again, instead of being produced in a concentrated burst, the band's next album, Changing Colours was recorded over an unusually extended period in 2017. The 17-track album was engineered, co-produced, and mixed by Thomas D'Arcy at Taurus Recording in Toronto, with Ewan Currie again in the producer role, and was released in February 2018.  "Most of the records we've made have been under a short time constraint," drummer Sam Corbett is quoted as saying. "This one was done over six months, with some songs sitting around for two months. Then we'd come back and try different things, so I think that as a result, some of the songs took a different shape."

The Changing Colours sessions also marked the recording debut of guitarist Jimmy Bowskill, performing not only guitar but mandolin, banjo, viola, fiddle, and pedal steel. "He joined us on tour, learned our whole set basically in one rehearsal and has been with us ever since," says bass player Ryan Gullen.

The promotion of the album again saw the Sheepdogs embarking on multiple national and international tours, playing over 200 shows in Canada, Europe and the United States.

Corbett announced in October 2018 that he would not tour with the band in the United States and Europe after being diagnosed with cancer. He underwent surgery in the summer of that year and began further treatment in the fall. Corbett resumed his post in the band on New Year's Eve for a show in Niagara Falls, Ontario that was broadcast live on CBC Television. Corbett announced his return in a December 22, 2018 Facebook post in which he also announced the birth of his first child.

In early 2019, the band continued their promotion and touring of Changing Colours by joining Rival Sons on tour first in Europe and then in the US, including dates at  The Bataclan, Paris and The Sheepdogs first Scandinavian shows in Sweden, Denmark and Oslo, Norway. 2019 also saw two Juno Award nominations for the band, this time for "Group of the Year" and for "Rock Album of the Year".

Frontman Ewan Currie recorded his debut solo album, Out of My Mind, in San Francisco, California. The album was released via Warner Music Canada on March 29, 2019.

In November 2019, the Sheepdogs performed two songs live on television as part of the NHL Heritage Classic at Mosaic Stadium in Regina, Saskatchewan.

Pandemic adjustments: No Simple Thing EP, Live at Lee's (2020 - 2021)
Coming off the international success of Changing Colours and subsequent busy touring schedule, the Sheepdogs announced in early 2020 that they would be embarking on a 10-date Canadian tour with The Black Keys.

It was also announced that the Sheepdogs would appear as part of the 2020 Juno Awards as presenters in their hometown of Saskatoon.

In March 2020, the COVID19 pandemic stopped all touring and live performance activities. The Sheepdogs took part in a live CBC Canada Day performance on July 1, 2020, from Montreal, Quebec marking their first performance since the beginning of the pandemic.

Following this performance the Sheepdogs stayed in Montreal and began tracking songs at MixART studios, tracking new songs together for the first time since the release of Changing Colours. The songs were recorded all in a room together, live off the floor to a Studer A827 24 2” tape machine.

In the summer and fall of 2020 the band performed a series of drive-in performances in Ontario and a concert series in Regina, Saskatchewan playing to hotel room balconies.

On April 30, 2021, it was announced that an EP, No Simple Thing would be released. The first single “Keep On Loving You” was released on that day.

With touring still not happening in a normal capacity, the Sheepdogs built a makeshift TV studio and filmed a series of performance videos for every song on the album. The album garnered two top 5 singles in Canada. The band played a limited number of live performances in Canada in the summer of 2021 and performed at the halftime show at the annual Saskatchewan Roughrider game the Labour Day Classic at Mosaic Stadium in Regina.

In November 2021, coinciding with the return of full capacity indoor shows, the Sheepdogs announced they would be performing four nights at Lee's Palace in Toronto (November 17–20). The four sold-out shows were filmed and recorded. Live at Lee's, the band's first live album, was released in February 2022.

Lineup change and new album: Outta Sight (2022 - present)
In the spring of 2022, the Sheepdogs announced an extensive world tour of nearly 100 dates including stops in the UK, Europe and North America.

Shortly after this the band announced that their new album, Outta Sight, would be released in June 2022. The album's first single, "Find the Truth," was released April 2022.

In August 2022 the band announced that Jimmy Bowskill would be stepping
away from touring with the band for the time being to focus on other projects. Guitarist Ricky Paquette joined the band on the North American tour starting in September 2022.

The Sheepdogs released their first Christmas song, “I’m Ready For Christmas,” in December 2022.

The Live and Outta Sight Tour concluded in Ottawa January of 2023 with a majority of the dates selling out across North America. In January, following the conclusion, additional dates in Australia were announced to take place in April.

Also in January, Outta Sight was nominated for a Juno Award for Rock Album of the year.

Band members
Current
 Ewan Currie – lead vocals, guitars, keys, primary songwriter (2004–present)
 Ryan Gullen – bass, backing vocals (2004–present)
 Sam Corbett – drums, percussion, backing vocals (2004–present)
 Shamus Currie – keys, trombone, guitars, backing vocals (2012–present)
 Ricky Paquette – guitars, backing vocals (2022–present)

Former
 Leot Hanson – guitar, backing vocals (2006–2014)
 Rusty Matyas – guitar, backing vocals (2014–2015)
 Jimmy Bowskill – guitars, pedal steel guitar, violin, mandolin, backing vocals (2015–2022)

Timeline

Side projects
 Brothers Ewan and Shamus Currie have recorded an album together in a project called BROS. The debut LP, Vol.1, was released in October 2016. A second album, Vol. 2, was released in July 2021.
 Front man Ewan Currie released his debut solo album, Out of My Mind, in March 2019.
 In January 2023, it was announced that Shamus Currie would release a fantasy rock concept album The Shepherd and the Wolf was released on February 24, 2023. The first single, “Days of High Adventure,” was released on January 6, 2023.
 In February 2023, it was announced that Sam Corbett would release a solo effort under the name Nutana, to be released on April 7, 2023.

Discography

Albums

EPs

7-inch vinyl releases

Singles

Music videos

Notes

Filmography

Film

Television

Awards and nominations

References

External links

 
The Sheepdogs  CanConRox bio

Canadian blues rock musical groups
Musical groups established in 2006
Musical groups from Saskatoon
Juno Award for Single of the Year winners
Juno Award for Breakthrough Group of the Year winners
Juno Award for Rock Album of the Year winners
2006 establishments in Saskatchewan